José Antonio Medina Alvarado (born August 13, 1996, in Mexico City) is a Mexican professional footballer who plays as a midfielder. He previously played for Pioneros de Cancún.

References

1996 births
Living people
Mexican footballers
Footballers from Mexico City
Association football midfielders
Ascenso MX players
Liga Premier de México players
Club Universidad Nacional footballers
Atlante F.C. footballers
Venados F.C. players
Pioneros de Cancún footballers